Oscar Gomer Swahn (20 October 1847 – 1 May 1927) was a Swedish shooter who competed at three Olympic games and won six medals, including three gold. Swahn holds records as the oldest Olympian at the time of competition, the oldest person to win gold, and the oldest person to win an Olympic medal.

Biography
At the 1908 Summer Olympics, Oscar Swahn won two gold medals in the running deer, single shot events (individual and team), and a bronze medal in the running deer double shot individual event. He was 60 years old, a year younger than Joshua Millner, the oldest gold medalist at that time.

When the 1912 Summer Olympics came to his native country, Sweden, he was a member of the single shot running deer team which again won the gold medal. He also won bronze again at the individual double shot running deer event, but came joint fourth in the individual single shot event, which was won by his son Alfred Swahn. At 64 years and 258 days of age, he became the oldest gold medallist ever, a record he still holds.

At the 1920 Summer Olympics, he became the oldest athlete ever to compete in the Olympics at the age of 72. His best results were in the team competitions: a fourth place in the single shot running deer event, and a second place in the double shot running deer contest. With this silver medal, he is also the oldest medallist of all time (not counting the art competitions).

In all of the Swedish shooting teams competitions that Oscar Swahn competed with at Olympic games of 1908, 1912, and 1920, he competed alongside his son, Alfred Swahn.

References

External links

1847 births
1927 deaths
People from Tanum Municipality
Swedish male sport shooters
Olympic shooters of Sweden
Running target shooters
Olympic gold medalists for Sweden
Olympic silver medalists for Sweden
Olympic bronze medalists for Sweden
Shooters at the 1908 Summer Olympics
Shooters at the 1912 Summer Olympics
Shooters at the 1920 Summer Olympics
Olympic medalists in shooting
Medalists at the 1908 Summer Olympics
Medalists at the 1912 Summer Olympics
Medalists at the 1920 Summer Olympics
Sportspeople from Västra Götaland County
19th-century Swedish people
20th-century Swedish people